Dihomo-γ-linolenic acid (DGLA) is a 20-carbon ω−6 fatty acid. (also called, cis,cis,cis-8,11,14-Eicosatrienoic acid) In physiological literature, it is given the name 20:3 (ω−6).   DGLA is a carboxylic acid with a 20-carbon chain and three cis double bonds; the first double bond is located at the sixth carbon from the omega end.  DGLA is the elongation product of γ-linolenic acid (GLA; 18:3, ω−6). GLA, in turn, is a desaturation product (Delta 6 desaturase) of linoleic acid (18:2, ω−6). DGLA is made in the body by the elongation of GLA, by an efficient enzyme which does not appear to suffer any form of (dietary) inhibition. DGLA is an extremely uncommon fatty acid, found only in trace amounts in animal products.

Biological effects
The eicosanoid metabolites of DGLA are:
 Series-1 thromboxanes (thromboxanes with 1 double-bond), via the COX-1 and COX-2 pathways.
 Series-1 prostanoids, via the COX-1 and COX-2 pathways.
 A 15-hydroxyl derivative that blocks the transformation of arachidonic acid to leukotrienes.

All of these effects are anti-inflammatory.  This is in marked contrast with the analogous metabolites of arachidonic acid (AA), which are the series-2 thromboxanes and prostanoids and the series-4 leukotrienes.  In addition to yielding anti-inflammatory eicosanoids, DGLA competes with AA for COX and lipoxygenase, inhibiting the production of AA's eicosanoids.

Taken orally in a small study, DGLA produced antithrombotic effects. Supplementing dietary GLA increases serum DGLA, as well as serum AA levels. Cosupplementation with GLA and EPA lowers serum AA levels by blocking Δ-5-desaturase activity, while also lowering leukotriene synthesis in neutrophils.

See also 
 Essential fatty acid

References

Fatty acids
Alkenoic acids